This is a list of railway stations within the West Midlands, a metropolitan county in central England which includes the cities of Birmingham, Coventry and Wolverhampton.  It includes all railway stations in the West Midlands that currently have regular timetabled train services, as well as certain stations outside the county which are within the area supported by Transport for West Midlands (TfWM), formerly known as Centro. Transport within the West Midlands is subsidised by TfWM, who since 2006 have used the brand name Network West Midlands to demonstrate the 'joined-up' nature of the regions bus and rail networks.

The West Midlands rail network is divided into five zones, centred on Birmingham city centre. This is mainly for the purpose of defining season ticket boundaries. For example, a ticket valid in zones 1 and 2 can be used for travel between any station in those zones, but cannot be used to travel to zone 3 or beyond.  The outside boundary is formed by the railway stations at Wolverhampton, Bloxwich North, Blake Street, Coventry, Dorridge, Earlswood, Longbridge, Stourbridge Junction and Stourbridge Town, inclusively.

Stations

The following table lists the name of each station, along with the year it first opened, the metropolitan district in which the station lies, and the zone in which it is situated. West Midlands Metro tram stops are not listed, except for locations which have an interchange with rail services. The table also shows the train operators who currently serve each station, and the final two columns give information on the number of passengers using each station in recent years, as collated by the Office of Rail and Road, a Government body. The figures are based on ticket sales, and are given to the nearest 100.

See also

 List of closed railway stations in the West Midlands
 List of railway stations in Merseyside
 List of railway stations in Manchester
 List of railway stations in Wales
 List of railway stations in Worcestershire
 List of closed railway stations in Britain
 List of closed railway stations in London
 List of London Underground stations
 List of London railway stations

Footnotes

 Wythall is in Worcestershire, and Earlswood lies on the border between the West Midlands and Warwickshire, however they are within zone 5 of the Network West Midlands area.
 Transport for West Midlands (TfWM) is the operating arm of the West Midlands Passenger Transport Authority (WMPTA) which sets policies and budgets for the executive. The WMPTA is a political body, made up of a number of councillors appointed from the seven West Midlands metropolitan borough councils.
 
 Birmingham Snow Hill was closed to passengers from 1972 to 1987.
 Coseley was closed in 1902, and rebuilt approximately 400 metres away from its original site.
 Two years previously, in 1850, a station was built nearby by the South Staffordshire line. When the Shrewsbury and Birmingham Railway built their station, they became known as Dudley Port Low Level, and Dudley Port High Level respectively. When the earlier station was closed to passengers in 1964, the High Level suffix was dropped from the surviving station.
 Five Ways was closed to passengers from 1944 to 1978.
 Hampton-in-Arden was closed in 1884, and rebuilt approximately 400 metres away from its original site.
 The present Longbridge is the second station to bear the name – the original stood some distance away on the now-closed branch to Halesowen from 1915 to 1964.
 Stourbridge Town was closed to passengers from 1915 to 1919.
 Built by the London & North Western Railway, the station is the only survivor of the three stations that once served the town. Both Sutton Town and Sutton Park stations were opened in 1879 by the Midland Railway, and closed in 1924 and 1965 respectively.
 The Hawthorns was closed to passengers from 1968 to 1995.
 Two years earlier, in 1847, a temporary station had been built at Bridgeman Place.
 In 1854 a second station was opened at Wolverhampton by the Great Western Railway. This became known as Wolverhampton Low Level, whilst the earlier London & North Western Railway station became known as Wolverhampton High Level. Wolverhampton Low Level was closed to passengers in 1972 and fully in 1981. The High Level station (now known as just Wolverhampton) remains open.

References

External links
 Centro
 National Rail Enquiries

West Midlands
Railway stations in the West Midlands (county)
Railway stations